The following are the winners of the 18th annual ENnie Awards, held in 2018:

Judges' Spotlight Winners 
Reece Carter: Fever Swamp, Melsonian Arts Council
Sean McCoy: Operation Unfathomable, Hydra Cooperative
Brian Nowak: FAITH – The Sci-Fi RPG 2.0, Burning Games
Denise Robinson: Winterhorn, Bully Pulpit Games
Kurt Wiegel: Pip System Corebook, Third Eye Games    Author:  Carol Darnell, Eloy Lasanta, Crystal Mazur, Derek Kamal, John D. Kennedy, Martin Manco, Amanda Milner, Jacob Wood

Gold and Silver Winners

References

 
ENnies winners